Bhānds (Devanagari: भांड; Urdu: بھانڈ, Gurmukhi: ਭੰਡ) are the traditional folk entertainers of India, Pakistan, Bangladesh, and Nepal. In India and Nepal, the Bahand are now an endogamous Muslim community, which is no longer involved in their traditional occupation of folk entertainment. They include actors, dancers, minstrels, storytellers and impressionists.

Payment for performances is usually voluntary: often, one performer goes around the audience collecting money on a "pay-what-you-can" basis while the others continue to perform. While most  belong to families that are engaged in folk entertainment as their hereditary profession, their specific art forms vary greatly by region, community and language. The term bhand itself can also mean both a specific dramatic story or an entire form/school of drama. Bhands kept an eye on a house where a child was due.  If the new born was a boy, bhands would perform in front of the house, blessing the child and family, and entertaining the neighbours.

Bhand of Uttar Pradesh 

In Uttar Pradesh, the Bahand are an endogamous Muslim community. Their ancestors were employed at the court of the various local rulers as folk entertainers, in particular at the court of the Nawabs of Awadh. Most Bahand in Uttar Pradesh are no longer involved with folk entertainment. What now binds the community is a sense of stigma attached to the community on account of their ancestral occupation. They are now mainly involved in wage labour; many Lucknow city are rickshaw puller. The community has been granted Other Backward Class status, which gives the community some benefits with regards reservation in public sector jobs. They are Sunni Muslims, and speak Urdu, and rarely dialects of Hindi. The Naqqal sub-group has done better, and now prefer the self-designation Kashmiri Shaikh. They are now a community of successful businessmen.

Bahand Pather of Kashmir

The storylines (or pathers) are often humorous and satirical, and farce is an essential component of the plays.

Naqal of Punjab
Naqal (mimicry) is a strong bahand tradition in the Punjab region. The naqalchi (mimic, sometimes called the bahrupiya) adopts the persona of a well-known person or character and improvises, using satire and farce extensively, to entertain the audience.

The Ustad and jamoora format
The ustad-jamoora format (ustad means master in Hindustani, while jamoora is an assistant or follower who is usually younger than the ustad) is a popular one in Hindi-speaking regions and involves only two bhand actors. Usually, the storylines consist of the ustad tutoring the jamoora to do or say something, and the jamoora responding with mechanical obedience with a subtle variation thrown in that creates a strong comical or satirical effect.

See also
Behrupiya

References

Muslim communities of India
Social groups of Jammu and Kashmir
Social groups of Uttar Pradesh
Muslim communities of Uttar Pradesh
Social groups of Pakistan
Folk artists
Performing arts in India
Performing castes
Performing arts in Pakistan